Club de Fútbol Vilanova is a Spanish football team based in Vilanova i la Geltrú, in the autonomous community of Catalonia. Founded in 1951, it plays in Primera Catalana, holding home matches at Camp Municipal d'Esports, with a 3,500-seat capacity.

The club's first match was played on 7 October 1951.

History 
The club was founded in 1951, playing its first official match on October 7, 1951.

Season to season

19 seasons in Tercera División

Current squad

Former players
  José Andrés Bilibio
  Juan Epitié
  Rubén Epitié

References

External links
Official website 
Futbolme team profile 

Football clubs in Catalonia
Association football clubs established in 1951
Vilanova i la Geltrú
Divisiones Regionales de Fútbol clubs
1951 establishments in Spain